The women's triple jump at the 2006 European Athletics Championships were held at the Ullevi on August 8 and August 9.

Medalists

Schedule

Results

Qualification
Qualification: Qualifying Performance 14.05 (Q) or at least 12 best performers (q) advance to the final.

Final

External links
Results

Triple jump
Triple jump at the European Athletics Championships
2006 in women's athletics